Sule Olaleye (born 10 October 1967) is a Nigerian table tennis player. He competed at the 1992 Summer Olympics and the 1996 Summer Olympics.

References

External links
 

1967 births
Living people
Nigerian male table tennis players
Olympic table tennis players of Nigeria
Table tennis players at the 1992 Summer Olympics
Table tennis players at the 1996 Summer Olympics
Place of birth missing (living people)